Lieutenant General Philip Smith,  (10 January 1837 – 1 November 1894) was a senior British Army officer who served as Major General commanding the Brigade of Guards and General Officer Commanding the Home District from 1889 until his retirement in 1892.

Family
Smith was born at the Woodhall estate in Hertfordshire, the third son of Colonel Abel Smith and Frances Anne Calvert, daughter of General Sir Harry Calvert.

Military career
Smith was commissioned into the Grenadier Guards in 1855. He went on to be adjutant of his regiment in 1859. He became commanding officer of a battalion of his regiment in 1880 and was appointed a Companion of the Order of the Bath following the Expedition to Egypt in 1882. He took command of the whole Regiment in 1885.

He was promoted to major general in 1886, and made major general commanding the Brigade of Guards and general officer commanding the Home District in 1889. He became a member of the council of the National Rifle Association and died at Hinchingbrooke House in 1894.

References

 

1837 births
1894 deaths
Military personnel from Hertfordshire
Companions of the Order of the Bath
British Army lieutenant generals
Grenadier Guards officers
British Army personnel of the Mahdist War
People of the National Rifle Association